Maxine Elliott Hicks (October 5, 1904 – January 10, 2000) was an American actress.

Life and career
Maxine Elliott Hicks was born in Denver, Colorado to George W. and Margaret Hicks. She began acting on the stage from the age of 5.  As Maxine Hicks, she was a starlet of the silent film era, with over 200 credited and uncredited roles between 1914 and 1937. Her most famous roles were as Felice, the daughter of Ethel Barrymore's character in the 1917 version of The Eternal Mother, and the nemesis Susie May Squoggs in The Poor Little Rich Girl.

Hicks successfully made the transition from silents into talking pictures but left acting in 1937 when she and her mother got into a dispute with Jack Warner, the head of Warner Bros. studio.  

After a decades-long hiatus, she returned to acting in 1976 as Maxine Elliott, playing character parts in television shows such as All in the Family and had a recurring role in Just the Ten of Us. She also appeared in commercials and movies, including Defending Your Life.

Hicks was married to Frank Dodge from 1938 to 1948.

Death 
Hicks died at the age of 95 on January 10, 2000, in San Clemente, California. She was survived by three sons, seven grandchildren and five great-grandchildren.

Filmography

Films

Television

Short films

References

External links

1904 births
2000 deaths
20th-century American actresses
American film actresses
American stage actresses
Actresses from Denver
American child actresses
Actresses from New York City
Burials at Forest Lawn Memorial Park (Hollywood Hills)